Sumet Akarapong is a Thai professional footballer who plays as a defender who played for Thailand in the 1992 Asian Cup.

External links
 

1971 births
Living people
Sumet Akarapong
Association football defenders
Sumet Akarapong
Footballers at the 1990 Asian Games
1992 AFC Asian Cup
Sumet Akarapong
Sumet Akarapong
Southeast Asian Games medalists in football
Competitors at the 1993 Southeast Asian Games
Sumet Akarapong